The Garden of Eden is a 1998 Italian drama film directed by Alessandro D'Alatri. It entered the competition at the 59th Venice International Film Festival, in which Kim Rossi Stuart won the Pasinetti Award.

Cast 
Kim Rossi Stuart: Jeoshua 
Boris Terral: Jochanan 
Kassandra Voyagis: Miriam 
Saïd Taghmaoui: Aziz 
Jovanotti: Discepolo degli Esseni 
Massimo Ghini: Soldato romano

References

External links

1998 films
Italian adventure drama films
1990s adventure drama films
Films directed by Alessandro D'Alatri
1998 drama films
1990s Italian films